Thiru Eadu Vasippu is the festival celebrated in the worship centers of Ayyavazhi. It is celebrated for three, five, seven, ten or seventeen days annually. During these days the holy scripture of Ayyavazhi, the Akilathirattu Ammanai is sung. In Swamithoppe pathi also called as Tetcanaa Pathi(தெட்சணா பதி), the festival it's starts on the third Friday in the Tamil month of Kathikai (falls approximately in the first week of December) and continues for seventeen days and ends on the first Sunday of the Tamil month of Margazhi. 

Ayyavazhi